Women have competed in artistic gymnastics at the Olympic Games since 1928.  While many women artistic gymnasts have competed in multiple Olympic Games, only four have competed in at least four separate Games: Oksana Chusovitina (8), Daniele Hypólito (5), Olga Tass (4), and Vanessa Ferrari (4).

See also

List of Olympic medal leaders in women's gymnastics
List of top female medalists at major artistic gymnastics events

References

appearances
Lists of Olympic female gymnasts